The 1882 NYU Violets football team was an American football team that represented New York University in the 1882 college football season. The team played two games, losing to Stevens Prep school and Columbia College.

Schedule

References

NYU
NYU Violets football seasons
College football winless seasons
NYU Violets football